MFK Detva is a Slovak association football club located in Detva. It plays in 3. liga (3rd level).

Colors and badge 
Its colors are white and green.

Current squad 
As of 1.5.2018

External links
Official club website 
  
Futbalnet profile 
MFK Detva on Náš futbal portal

References

Football clubs in Slovakia
Association football clubs established in 1936